Lilium amabile, also known as the friendly lily or lovable lily, is a flowering bulbous perennial plant in the lily family Liliaceae. The Latin specific epithet  means "lovable".

Description
The flowers are either solitary or in a raceme of 3 flowers. The sepals and petals are red, sometimes dark red-orange or yellow. The plant has been described as having an unpleasant, rotting smell.

Distribution and habitat
Lilium amabile is native to China's Liaoning Province and Korea.

References

amabile
Flora of Liaoning
Flora of Korea
Plants described in 1901